The United States Army Medical Department (AMEDD) Captains Career Course (CCC) is an Officer Advance Course (OAC) taught at Fort Sam Houston, Texas that provides graduate level leadership training for all six special officer branches (corps) in the AMEDD.

The AMEDD Captains Career Course is designed to train officers to lead company or equivalent-sized organizations and serve successfully in U.S. Army staff positions. Graduates are prepared for subsequent assignments by learning the leader, tactical, and technical tasks, including the supporting knowledge and skills necessary to support joint operations across the full spectrum of military operations.

History
In 1994 the AMEDD Director of Personnel raised the issue of a combined, all-corps AMEDD Officer Advance Course (OAC) to promote consistency in education for AMEDD officers competing for command positions.

The AMEDD Center and School (AMEDDC&S) initiated the reengineered course in 1996. The course consisted of a distance learning phase followed by ten weeks of resident training (forty-five days all corps and one week for corps-specific training).

In 2001, the Commanding General of the AMEDDC&S at the time further reduced the length of the course to nine weeks of resident training (forty-three days all corps and two days for corps-specific training).

Organization

Academic Structure
AMEDD Center & School
Academy of Health Sciences
Leader Training Center
Captains Career Course Branch

Administrative Structure
AMEDD Center & School
32nd Medical Brigade
187th Medical Battalion
Alpha Company

Phases and Variations
The AMEDD Captains Career Course is organized into two phases. Phase I consisting of distributed learning (dL) that must be complete before moving on to the next phase. Phase II consists of a temporary duty (TDY) resident phase at Fort Sam Houston, Texas.
Depending on which version of the course students are attending, Phase II can be up to nine weeks long.

See also
Fort Sam Houston, Texas
Military Health System

Notes

References

External links
AMEDD Captains Career Course - official website
AMEDD Captains Career Course on milBook
Fort Sam Houston, Texas - official website

Military education and training in the United States
Military medicine in the United States
Joint Base San Antonio
Healthcare in Texas
1996 establishments in Texas